E. K. Pillai (4 May 1926 – 12 July 2000) was an Indian politician and leader of Communist Party of India. He represented Pathanapuram constituency in 5th and 6th Kerala Legislative Assembly.

References

Communist Party of India politicians from Kerala
1926 births
2000 deaths
Kerala MLAs 1977–1979
Kerala MLAs 1980–1982
People from Kollam district